Chance Thomas is an American composer, author, and entrepreneur. As a composer, he creates original music for animation, video games, movies, television, and virtual reality. His music has received critical acclaim and commercial success, including an Oscar, an Emmy, and billions of dollars in sales worldwide. 

Chance is best known for scoring video games like DOTA 2, The Lord of the Rings Online and James Cameron’s Avatar. He also scored Columbia Pictures’ The ChubbChubbs!, which won an Academy Award for Best Animated Short Film, and the TV film Lost Treasure Hunt, which was nominated for two Emmy Awards.

Chance is the author of the university textbook Composing Music for Games: The Art, Technology and Business of Video Game Scoring. The book was released in 2016 by CRC Press, a Taylor and Francis Publishing imprint. As an entrepreneur, Chance founded "HUGEST" sound in 1998 and sold it in 2016 to a large and diversified entertainment conglomerate, R Legacy Entertainment. He now serves as VP of Music and Creative Development for the new HUGEsound Post Production.

His projects have won major awards, including an Oscar, Emmy, IGN, Telly, Aurora and several G.A.N.G. awards. He is considered the father of game music Grammy eligibility and was honored in 2013 with the Game Audio Network Guild's Recognition Award.

Early life 

Throughout high school, Thomas formed and played in progressive rock bands until he was called to serve a mission in northern Italy for the LDS Church. When he returned home in 1982, he met his bride-to-be, Pamela, at a single's ward family home evening. Thomas worked at UPS, putting his music on hold while pursuing a business degree at Central Oklahoma State University. A torn shoulder muscle reopened the music door. "While I was in rehab, my friend called and told me about a pizza restaurant that was looking for entertainers." Thomas got the job, which paid more than UPS. After two and a half years in Oklahoma, he received a transfer scholarship to finish his business degree at Brigham Young University in Utah. Shortly after his transfer, he switched his scholarship to the music school and eventually graduated with a bachelor's degree in music.

Career 

Chance Thomas began his professional career as a performer, singing and playing piano as well as keyboard at ski resorts in the Rocky Mountains and on cruise ships in the Caribbean.  In 1991, he opened a small music production company and studio in Salt Lake City, Utah, called byChance Productions and began creating music for ad agencies and corporate clients.  He carved out a particular niche with orchestral scores for public service announcements produced by non-profits like The Salvation Army, The Church of Jesus Christ of Latter-day Saints, and The United Way.

He emerged into the video game industry in 1996. At the time, Sierra Online was looking for a full-time composer, and Chance moved back to California to take the job. This opportunity allowed him to write music for Quest for Glory V: Dragon Fire, creating one of the first orchestral video game scores in history. In the late 1990s, Chance led a successful movement which brought game music into the Grammy Awards. The Quest for Glory soundtrack was a factor in getting the Grammys to create three new categories — Best Score, Best Song and Best Soundtrack for Film, Television and Other Visual Media.

Chance has also been an important innovator in video games. He led the design and implementation of one of the world's first successful adaptive music systems based on digital audio streams (1997). He also pioneered new techniques for composing game music, including ambient set matrices (1996) and interactive scoring maps (2001). When Sierra Online closed the doors of its California studio in 1998, Chance opened HUGEsound, located just outside Yosemite National Park.  Projects scored during that time included the Oscar-winning film, The ChubbChubbs!, and games like Peter Jackson’s King Kong, Marvel Ultimate Alliance, and Lord of the Rings Online.

In 2007, Chance relocated HUGEsound to Utah and continued to compose for high-profile game titles like James Cameron’s Avatar, Heroes of Might and Magic, and DOTA 2.

Lord Of The Rings Online 

Chance Thomas' Lord of the Rings Online (LOTRO) scores are among his most acclaimed and documented work so far. Each of his compositions is based on years of personal research into the literature; the crafting instrumental palettes, vocal ranges, stylistic tendencies and emotional conjuring based on direct references/inferences scattered throughout the text. On June 16, 2017, Thomas released The Lord of the Rings Online: 10th Anniversary Commemorative Soundtrack through HUGEsound Records. The album contains tracks from 2007 to 2017.

HUGEsound 

In 1998, Chance launched HUGEsound in Oakhurst, California as a full-service audio development company to service clients in film and gaming.  HUGEsound provided sound design, foley, original music scoring and song production for The ChubbChubbs!, among other projects, for nearly 20 years.  In September 2016, Chance sold HUGEsound to R Legacy Entertainment, a privately held umbrella corporation containing a diversified portfolio of entertainment companies in Nashville, Los Angeles, and Salt Lake City.

In February 2017, HUGEsound Post Production opened its doors as a new 16,000 square foot recording and production facility. The new HUGEsound offers a full range of post-production services in picture, music, and sound.

Volunteer work 

Chance has served in volunteer capacities for community councils, universities, churches, food banks and industry organizations throughout his career. In 1994, he launched the annual Wasatch Front Frozen Turkey Hunt for the Utah Food Bank. In 1998, he helped organize the Music and Sound award review committees for the Academy of Interactive Arts and Sciences and led those committees for 2 years. In 2002, he helped found the Game Audio Network Guild and served on its board of directors for 15 years.  In 2007, he joined the Advisory Board for the Game Developers Conference (GDC).  He has served on Advisory Boards for the Musicians Institute, Brigham Young University and Full Sail University.

Public speaking 

Chance speaks regularly at universities, colleges and professional conferences on the art, craft, tech, and business of music scoring. He has spoken at the University of Southern California, University of Michigan, San Francisco Conservatory of Music, Cincinnati Conservatory of Music, Oklahoma City University, Berklee College of Music, Full Sail University, Musicians Institute, VRDC, FMX Animation Conference, GameSoundCon and the Game Developers Conference, among many others. Chance won the Ace of Spades Award from GDC in 2010, given to the speaker with the highest rated talk of the entire conference.

Book 

In 2016 CRC Press released Chance's textbook, Composing Music for Games: The Art, Technology and Business of Video Game Scoring. The text is a guidebook for launching and maintaining a successful career as a video game composer. It offers a pragmatic approach to learning, intensified through challenging project assignments and simulations. The book begins with the foundation of scoring principles applicable to all media, and then progresses serially through core methodologies specific to video game music. This book offers a blend of aesthetic, technique, technology and business, which are all necessary components for a successful career as a video game composer.

Discography
The lists below show some of Thomas' most notable work in various scoring categories.

Video games 

{| class="wikitable"
YearTitleCompany1996The RealmSierra1998Quest For Glory V: Dragon FireSierra1998Police Quest: SWAT 2Sierra2002Earth & BeyondEA Games2002The Lord Of The Rings: The Two TowersEA Games2002The Lord of the Rings: The Fellowship of the Ring (Trailer)Sierra2002Warcraft III: Reign Of Chaos (Trailer)Blizzard2003The HobbitSierra2003The Lord of the Rings: War of the RingVivendi Universal Games2003Unreal II: The AwakeningLegend Entertainment2005Peter Jackson's King KongUbisoft2006Paraworld (Trailer)SEK2006Left Behind: Eternal ForcesLeft Behind Games2006X-Men: The Official GameActivision2006Marvel: Ultimate AllianceActivision2006Dungeons & Dragons OnlineTurbine2007The Lord Of The Rings Online: Shadows Of AngmarWarner Bros.2008Left Behind: Tribulation ForcesLeft Behind Games2008The Lord Of The Rings Online: Mines Of MoriaWarner Bros.2008Nerf-N-StrikeEA Games2008Littlest Pet Shop (Series)EA Games2009Nerf-N-Strike EliteEA Games2009Champions OnlineAtari2009James Cameron's AvatarUbisoft2010Left Behind 3: Rise of the Antichrist Left Behind Games2010Monopoly StreetsEA Games2011Lego Star Wars III: The Clone WarsLucasArts2011Combat Of Giants: Dinosaurs 3DUbisoft2012CytusRayark Games
|-
|2012
|The Lord of the Rings Online: Riders of Rohan
|Warner Brothers Interactive
|-
|2012
|Dungeons and Dragons Online: Menace of the Underdark
|Warner Brothers Interactive2014Dota 2 TI4 Battle PassValve2014Valiant Hearts: The Great WarUbisoft2014Might & Magic Duel Of Champions: Forgotten WarsUbisoft2015FIVE: Guardians of DavidKingdom Games LLC2017FaeriaAbrakam Entertainment
|-
|2017
|The Lord of the Rings Online: Mordor
|Standing Stone Games
|-
|2018
|DOTA 2 TI8 Battle Pass
|Valve
|}

Television

Film

Virtual reality

References

External links
 Official website
 HUGEsound official website
 
 An interview with Composer Chance Thomas

American film score composers
American male film score composers
American Latter Day Saints
Living people
American Mormon missionaries in Italy
Sierra On-Line employees
Video game composers
20th-century Mormon missionaries
1961 births